Lasiochilus fusculus is a species of true bug in the family Lasiochilidae. It is found in the Caribbean Sea and North America.

References

Further reading

 

Articles created by Qbugbot
Insects described in 1871
Lasiochilidae